Sports teams of Scotland is an incomplete list of the national sports teams representing Scotland.

Scottish representative teams

Multi-sport events
Scotland, the team sent by the Commonwealth Games Council for Scotland to represent the country at the Commonwealth Games
Scotland at the 2022 Commonwealth Games
Scotland at the 2018 Commonwealth Games
Scotland at the 2014 Commonwealth Games
Scotland at the 2010 Commonwealth Games
Scotland at the 2006 Commonwealth Games
Scotland at the 2002 Commonwealth Games
Scotland at the 1998 Commonwealth Games
Scotland at the 1994 Commonwealth Games
Scotland at the 1990 Commonwealth Games
Scotland at the 1986 Commonwealth Games
Scotland at the 1982 Commonwealth Games
Scotland at the 1978 Commonwealth Games
Scotland at the 1974 British Commonwealth Games
Scotland at the 1970 British Commonwealth Games
Scotland at the 1966 British Empire and Commonwealth Games
Scotland at the 1962 British Empire and Commonwealth Games
Scotland at the 1958 British Empire and Commonwealth Games
Scotland at the 1954 British Empire and Commonwealth Games
Scotland at the 1950 British Empire Games
Scotland at the 1938 British Empire Games
Scotland at the 1934 British Empire Games
Scotland at the 1930 British Empire Games

Scotland, the team sent by the Commonwealth Games Council for Scotland to represent the country at the Commonwealth Youth Games

Football
Scotland men's national football team
Scotland at the 1998 FIFA World Cup
Scotland at the 1990 FIFA World Cup
Scotland at the 1986 FIFA World Cup
Scotland at the 1982 FIFA World Cup
Scotland at the 1978 FIFA World Cup
Scotland at the 1974 FIFA World Cup
Scotland at the 1958 FIFA World Cup
Scotland at the 1954 FIFA World Cup
Scotland women's national football team
Scotland national under-21 football team
Scotland national under-19 football team
Scotland B national football team

Rugby union

Scotland national rugby union team
 Scotland at the Rugby World Cup
Scotland national rugby sevens team
Scotland A national rugby union team
Scotland women's national rugby union team
Scotland national under-20 rugby union team
Scotland national under-18 rugby union team
Scotland national under-16 rugby union team
Scotland Club XV International rugby union team
Scotland national rugby sevens team
Scotland women's national rugby sevens team

Australian rules football
 Scotland National Australian Rules team

Badminton
 Scotland national badminton team

Baseball
Scotland national baseball team

Basketball
Scotland national basketball team
Scotland men's national under-18 basketball team
Scotland men's national under-16 basketball team
Scotland women's national basketball team
Scotland women's national under-18 basketball team
Scotland women's national under-16 basketball team

Cricket

Scotland national cricket team
Scotland women's national cricket team
Scotland national under-19 cricket team

Curling
Note - curling teams are frequently mixed gender

Scotland national curling team
Scotland men's national curling team
Scotland women's national curling team

Cycling
Scotland national cycling team

Field hockey
Scotland men's national field hockey team
Scotland women's national field hockey team

Futsal
Scotland national futsal team

Ice hockey
 Scotland national ice hockey team

Kabaddi
 Scotland national kabaddi team

Korfball
 Scotland national korfball team

Lacrosse
 Scotland national men's lacrosse team
 Scotland national women's lacrosse team
 Scotland national indoor lacrosse team

Netball
 Scotland national netball team

Quadball 
 Scotland national quadball team

Roller derby
 Power of Scotland
 Team Scotland Roller Derby

Rugby league
 Scotland national rugby league team
 Scotland A national rugby league team
 Scotland national wheelchair rugby league team

Shinty
There is an annual Composite rules Shinty/Hurling, played against Ireland.

Scotland national shinty team
Scotland national women's shinty team
Scotland U21 national shinty team
Camanachd na h-Alba (Scottish Gaelic Speakers)

Squash
 Scotland men's national squash team
 Scotland women's national squash team

See also
Campaign for a Scottish Olympic Team
Sport in Scotland
Scottish Claymores
Ecurie Ecosse

 List
Nat

Sports